Measure is an international journal of formal poetry. It was founded by Paul Bone and Rob Griffith in 2005, following the demise of The Formalist. Measure is published by Measure Press and funded in part by the University of Evansville. The journal features poetry, critical essays, and interviews. Notable past contributors include Kelly Cherry, Rachel Hadas, Allison Joseph, Derek Walcott, Richard Wilbur, and many others.

The print magazine ceased publication in 2018,  although Measure Press continued.  An electronic journal, Measure Review: A Magazine of Formal Poetry, continues.

See also 
 Howard Nemerov Sonnet Award
 Donald Justice Poetry Prize
 New Formalism

References

External links
 

2005 establishments in Indiana
2018 disestablishments in Indiana
Biannual magazines published in the United States
Defunct literary magazines published in the United States
Magazines established in 2005
Magazines disestablished in 2018
Magazines published in Indiana
Mass media in Evansville, Indiana
Online literary magazines published in the United States
Online magazines with defunct print editions
Poetry magazines published in the United States
Weekly magazines published in the United States